is a Japanese footballer who currently plays for FC Tokushima from 2023.

Career statistics

Club
.

Notes

References

External links

2001 births
Living people
Japanese footballers
Juntendo University alumni
Association football midfielders
J3 League players
FC Tokyo players
FC Tokyo U-23 players
FC Tokushima players